WDYF (90.3 FM, "Faith Radio") is a radio station licensed to serve Dothan, Alabama, United States. The station is owned by Faith Broadcasting, Inc. It airs a Christian radio format.

WDYF operates with a main studio waiver that allows it to be a satellite of co-owned non-commercial educational sister station WLBF in Montgomery, Alabama, with its main studio at the WLBF studio location.

History
Originally applied for in April 1993, the station was finally granted a construction permit by the Federal Communications Commission on November 19, 1999. The station was assigned the WDYF call letters by the FCC on March 26, 2001. The FCC granted the station its license to cover on July 10, 2002.

References

External links

Radio stations established in 2002
DYF
Moody Radio affiliate stations
2002 establishments in Alabama